Wagan is a village in east-central Poland.

Wagan may also refer to:
 Wagan Land, a 1989 platform video game for the Famicom
 Wagan Paradise, a 1994 platforming game for the Super Famicom
 Wagan City, a city in Sindh, Pakistan
 Wagang (or Wagan), a village in Morobe Province, Papua New Guinea

See also 
 Samuel Wagan Watson (born 1972), a contemporary Indigenous Australian poet